USS Cheyenne (SSN-773), the final , is the third ship of the United States Navy to be named for Cheyenne, Wyoming. The contract to build her was awarded to Newport News Shipbuilding and Dry Dock Company in Newport News, Virginia on 28 November 1989 and her keel was laid down on 6 July 1992.  She was launched on 16 April 1995 sponsored by Mrs. Ann Simpson, wife of Wyoming Senator Alan K. Simpson, and commissioned on 13 September 1996, with Commander Peter H. Ozimik in command. Cheyenne transferred to her homeport of Pearl Harbor, Hawaii, in 1998.

Cheyenne has served as a trials platform for flat-screen, interoperative sonar displays based on commercially available equipment.

Cheyenne was the first ship to launch Tomahawk missiles in Operation Iraqi Freedom under the command of CDR Charles Doty. Cheyenne would go on to successfully launch her entire complement of Tomahawks, earning a "clean sweep" for combat actions in the final three months of a nine-month deployment. This dubbed her "First To Strike". Her motto is "Ride the Legend".

USS Cheyenne was the final Los Angeles–class submarine built by Newport News Shipyards.

History

In popular culture
Cheyenne is the primary subject of the book SSN by Tom Clancy, battling the People's Liberation Army Navy in a fictional war over the Spratly Islands. She is also featured in the video game by Tom Clancy called SSN.
In the 2000 novel Quicksilver by Judith and Garfield Reeves-Stevens, Cheyenne was ordered to fire a Tomahawk TLAM Block Four cruise missile, under manual control of Weapons Officer Lt. Miken Marano, at the River Entrance of the Pentagon.
In To the Death by Patrick Robinson, Cheyenne is tasked with shadowing an Iranian Kilo on a path through the Mediterranean Sea.

References

External links

 

1995 ships
Submarines of the United States
Los Angeles-class submarines
Nuclear submarines of the United States Navy
Ships built in Newport News, Virginia